West Gosford is a suburb of the Central Coast region of New South Wales, Australia. It is part of the  local government area. West Gosford is home to the Henry Kendall cottage and was home to the Gosford Classic Car Museum prior to its 2019 closure. While there is some residential areas, West Gosford is known as a retail and industry hub. Bunnings, Spotlight, Anaconda and Officeworks join the Gosford RSL and a Reliance Super Clinic along the Central Coast Highway.

The West Gosford shopping centre, containing Coles supermarket is in Brisbane Water Drive. Primewest's shopping centre is in nearby Manns Road.

Population 
In the 2016 Census, there were 1,335 people in West Gosford. 70.8% of people were born in Australia and 82.7% of people spoke only English at home. The most common responses for religion were No Religion 28.6%, Anglican 20.9% and Catholic 20.6%.

References 

Suburbs of the Central Coast (New South Wales)